This is a list of Croatian television related events from 1974.

Events

Debuts

Television shows

Ending this year

Births
5 April - Sandra Bagarić, Bosnian-born opera singer & actress

Deaths